The 2015–16 Boise State Broncos women's basketball team represented Boise State University during the 2015–16 NCAA Division I women's basketball season. The Broncos, led by 11th-year head coach Gordy Presnell, played their home games at Taco Bell Arena and were a member of the Mountain West Conference. They finished the season 19–11, 12–6 in Mountain West play to finish in third place. They lost in the quarterfinals of the Mountain West women's tournament to UNLV. Despite having 19 wins, they were not invited to a postseason tournament.

Roster

Schedule

|-
!colspan=9 style="background:#143D99; color:#FF6600;"| Exhibition

|-
!colspan=9 style="background:#143D99; color:#FF6600;"| Non-conference regular season

|-
!colspan=9 style="background:#143D99; color:#FF6600;"| Mountain West regular season

|-
!colspan=9 style="background:#143D99; color:#FF6600;"| Mountain West Women's Tournament

See also
 2015–16 Boise State Broncos men's basketball team

References

Boise State Broncos women's basketball seasons
Boise State
Boise
Boise